The 1985–86 OJHL season is the 14th season of the Ontario Junior Hockey League (OJHL). The six teams of the league played a 50-game season. The top four teams made the playoffs.

The winner of the OJHL playoffs, the Orillia Travelways, won the 1986 Buckland Cup for the OHA championship and the Dudley Hewitt Cup for the Central Canadian Championship. The Travelways failed to win the 1986 Centennial Cup.

Changes
Owen Sound Greys join OJHL from MWJHL.
Whitby Lawmen go on hiatus then fold.
North York Red Wings leave the OJHL.
Aurora Tigers take one-year leave.

Final standings
Note: GP = Games played; W = Wins; L = Losses; OTL = Overtime losses; SL = Shootout losses; GF = Goals for; GA = Goals against; PTS = Points; x = clinched playoff berth; y = clinched division title; z = clinched conference title

1985-86 OJHL Playoffs

Semi-final
Orillia Travelways defeated Newmarket Flyers 4-games-to-1
Markham Waxers defeated Owen Sound Greys 4-games-to-1
Final
Orillia Travelways defeated Markham Waxers 4-games-to-1

OHA Buckland Cup Championship
The 1986 Buckland Cup was a best-of-7 series between the Onaping Falls Huskies (NOJHL) and the Orillia Travelways.  The winner moved on to the 1986 Dudley Hewitt Cup Final Series.

Orillia Travelways defeated Onaping Falls Huskies (NOJHL) 4-games-to-2
Orillia 3 - Onaping Falls 2
Onaping Falls - Orillia
Onaping Falls 6 - Orillia 5
Orillia 6 - Onaping Falls 5 (OT)
Orillia 5 - Onaping Falls 4
Orillia 5 - Onaping Falls 3

1986 Dudley Hewitt Cup Championship
The 1986 Dudley Hewitt Cup was a best-of-7 series between the Brockville Braves (CJHL) and the Orillia Travelways.  The winner moved on to the 1986 Centennial Cup.

Orillia Travelways defeated Brockville Braves 4-games-to-3
Brockville 8 - Orillia 1
Brockville 9 - Orillia 1
Orillia 9 - Brockville 8
Orillia 6 - Brockville 5
Orillia 6 - Brockville 3
Brockville - Orillia
Orillia 7 - Brockville 4

1986 Centennial Cup Championship
The 1986 Centennial Cup was the Canadian National Junior A championship in Cole Harbour, Nova Scotia, hosted by the Cole Harbour Colts.  The Orillia Travelways lost in the semi-final.

Round Robin
Orillia Travelways defeated Moncton Hawks (MVJHL) 4-3
Cole Harbour Colts (MVJHL) defeated Orillia Travelways 9-5
Penticton Knights (BCJHL) defeated Orillia Travelways 5-2

Semi-final
Penticton Knights (BCJHL) defeated Orillia Travelways 7-3

Leading Scorers

Players taken in the 1986 NHL Entry Draft
Rd 6 #115	Matt O'Toole -	St. Louis Blues	(Markham Waxers)
Rd 12 #236	Doug Kirkton -	New Jersey Devils	(Orillia Travelways)

See also
 1986 Centennial Cup
 Dudley Hewitt Cup
 List of OJHL seasons
 Northern Ontario Junior Hockey League
 Central Junior A Hockey League
 Thunder Bay Flyers
 1985 in ice hockey
 1986 in ice hockey

References

External links
 Official website of the Ontario Junior Hockey League
 Official website of the Canadian Junior Hockey League

Ontario Junior Hockey League seasons
OPJHL